The 2004–05 Meistriliiga season was the 15th season of the Meistriliiga, the top level of ice hockey in Estonia. Five teams participated in the league, and HK Stars Tallinn won the championship.

Regular season

Playoffs

Semifinals 
 Tartu Välk 494 – HK Stars Tallinn 1:2 (2:1, 2:4, 0:1)
 HC Panter Tallinn – Narva PSK 2:1 (4:3, 0:2, 3:1)

3rd place
 Tartu Välk 494 – Narva PSK 1:2 (3:1, 2:5, 3:4)

Final 
 HC Panter Tallinn – HK Stars Tallinn 1:3 (6:3, 3:5, 4:5 n.P., 2:5)

External links
Season on hockeyarchives.info

Meistriliiga
Meistriliiga
Meistriliiga (ice hockey) seasons